The Federal Correctional Complex, Allenwood (FCC Allenwood) is a United States federal prison complex for male inmates in Pennsylvania. It is operated by the Federal Bureau of Prisons, a division of the United States Department of Justice.

The prison property is located in the following townships: Gregg in Union County, and two in Lycoming County: Brady, and Clinton.

Facilities
The complex consists of three facilities:

 Federal Correctional Institution, Allenwood Low (FCI Allenwood Low): a low-security facility
 Federal Correctional Institution, Allenwood Medium (FCI Allenwood Medium): a medium-security facility
 United States Penitentiary, Allenwood (USP Allenwood): a high-security facility

Notable inmates
Andrew Auernheimer, hacker better known as "weev"
 Carl Andrew Capasso, convicted of tax fraud; died in 2001
 James Holmes, perpetrator of the 2012 Aurora, Colorado shooting
 LaMarr Hoyt, baseball player, convicted of drug possession
 Mohammed Jabbateh, former Liberian warlord known as Jungle Jabbah; convicted of immigration fraud and perjury for lying about being a war criminal in the First Liberian Civil War
 Raymond Lederer, Democratic member of the United States House of Representatives, representing Pennsylvania's 3rd congressional district from 1977 to 1981. Convicted of bribery in 1981 after being implicated in the Abscam sting. Died in 2008 at his home.
 Bruce Pierce, white supremacist member of The Order and murderer of Jewish talk show host Alan Berg; died in prison in 2010
 Tommy Pitera, hitman for the Bonanno crime family; inmate transferred to USP McCreary in Kentucky
 John Rigas, former CEO of Adelphia Communications Corporation; released as of February 22, 2016.
 Martin Shkreli, former hedge fund manager and CEO of Turing Pharmaceuticals; convicted of two counts of securities fraud and one count of conspiracy to commit securities fraud

In popular culture
 Gil Scott-Heron's 1972 song "The King Alfred Plan" references Allenwood FCC as a possible location of one of the concentration camps set up for the CIA to imprison Black Americans in order to suppress a Black uprising, a theory derived from John A. Williams's 1967 novel The Man Who Cried I Am.

See also

 List of U.S. federal prisons
 Federal Bureau of Prisons
 Incarceration in the United States

References

Buildings and structures in Lycoming County, Pennsylvania
Buildings and structures in Union County, Pennsylvania
Allenwood
Allenwood